The TCA Award for Outstanding Achievement in Drama is an award given by the Television Critics Association.

Winners and nominees

Multiple wins

4 wins
 The Sopranos

3 wins
 The Americans (2 consecutive)
 Homicide: Life on the Street (consecutive)
 Lost (2 consecutive)
 Mad Men (2 consecutive)

2 wins
 Breaking Bad
 I'll Fly Away (consecutive)
Succession
 The West Wing (consecutive)

Multiple nominees

7 nominations
 Homicide: Life on the Street
 Law & Order
 Mad Men
 The Sopranos

6 nominations
 The Americans
 Game of Thrones
 Lost

5 nominations
 24
 Better Call Saul
 Breaking Bad
 NYPD Blue
 The X-Files

4 nominations
 The Crown
 Friday Night Lights
 The Good Fight
 L.A. Law
 The Shield
 St. Elsewhere
 thirtysomething
 The Wire

3 nominations
 ER
 The Good Wife
 The Handmaid's Tale
 Justified
 Pose
 The Practice
 Succession
 This Is Us

2 nominations
 Buffy the Vampire Slayer
 CSI: Crime Scene Investigation
 Deadwood
 Gilmore Girls
 Homefront
 Homeland
 House
 I'll Fly Away
 Killing Eve
 Northern Exposure
 Six Feet Under
 The West Wing

Total awards by network

 NBC – 10
 HBO – 8
 ABC – 7
 AMC – 6
 CBS – 3
 FX – 3
 Hulu – 1
 Netflix - 1
 PBS – 1

Total nominations by network

 NBC – 47
 ABC – 31
 HBO – 28
 FX – 19
 AMC – 17
 Fox - 13
 CBS – 12
 Netflix - 8
 PBS – 6
 The WB - 4
 Apple TV+ - 3
 Showtime - 3
 CBS All Access - 3
 Hulu – 3
 BBC America - 2
 The 101 Network - 2
 Disney+ - 1
 Lifetime - 1
 Paramount+ - 1 
 Starz - 1
 USA - 1

References

External links
 Official website

Drama